is a temple beside Lake Biwa in Ōtsu, Shiga Prefecture, Japan. The Heian period statue of Shō Kannon is an Important Cultural Property.

The temple, specifically the Ukimidō "floating temple" hall, features in one of the remaining views of the Eight Views of Ōmi, originally drawn by Hiroshige. The print featuring the temple is "The wild geese returning home at Katata" (堅田の落雁).

Access 
The temple can be reached from the Katata Station (on the JR West Lake West line (Kosei Line), JR西日本湖西線) via bus. On weekends there is a bus directly to the temple, while on weekdays the nearest stop is Demachi 出町, followed by a 7-minute walk.

Registered buildings
  (1766)
  (1754)
  (1812)
  (1937)
  (1937)

See also

Enryaku-ji
Ishiyama-dera
Mii-dera

References

Buddhist temples in Shiga Prefecture